Oleh Leonidovych Mochulyak (born 27 September 1974) is a Ukrainian former professional footballer. In 2008, he played for FJ Buxoro.

Careere
He took part in the 1991 UEFA European Under-16 Championship along with the Soviet team.

Personal life
He has a son, Renat, who is also a footballer.

European club competitions
 UEFA Intertoto Cup 1996 with FC Uralmash Yekaterinburg: 3 games.
 UEFA Cup 2002–03 with FC Zimbru Chişinău: 2 games.

External links
 Player profile at footballdatabase.eu
 
 Spivakovskiy, M. Mochulyak: I was left in woods only in slippers (МОЧУЛЯК: "Меня оставили в лесу в одних тапочках"). Sport.ua from "Sport-Express in Ukraine. 24 December 2009

References

1974 births
Living people
Footballers from Odesa
Ukrainian footballers
Soviet Union youth international footballers
Ukraine under-21 international footballers
Ukrainian expatriate footballers
Expatriate footballers in Russia
Ukrainian expatriate sportspeople in Russia
Expatriate footballers in Moldova
Ukrainian expatriate sportspeople in Moldova
Expatriate footballers in Kazakhstan
Ukrainian expatriate sportspeople in Kazakhstan
Expatriate footballers in Uzbekistan
Ukrainian expatriate sportspeople in Uzbekistan
Soviet Top League players
Ukrainian Premier League players
Russian Premier League players
Moldovan Super Liga players
Kazakhstan Premier League players
Uzbekistan Super League players
FC Nyva Ternopil players
FC Chornomorets Odesa players
FC Chornomorets-2 Odesa players
FC Ural Yekaterinburg players
FC Elista players
SC Odesa players
SC Tavriya Simferopol players
FC Ivan Odesa players
FC Zimbru Chișinău players
FC Taraz players
Buxoro FK players
FC Dnister Ovidiopol players
Association football forwards